Neuses may refer to the following places in Germany:

Neuses (Ansbach), a part of Ansbach, Bavaria
Neuses (Coburg), a part of Coburg, Bavaria
Neuses (Kronach), a part of Kronach, Bavaria
Neuses (Merkendorf), a part of Merkendorf, Bavaria